Las Vigas de Ramírez is a city in the Mexican state of Veracruz. It serves as the municipal seat for the surrounding municipality of the same name.

It is located 40 km from the state capital, Xalapa; it stands on the Mexico City to Veracruz railway and on Federal Highways 180 and 122. The city was established by decree on 23 November, 1523, named after the teacher Rafael Ramírez, who died in Mexico. Major agricultural products include corn, coffee, fruits, and rice. The town

References

External links 

  Municipal Official Site
  Municipal Official Information

Populated places in Veracruz